The 2018–19 South-West Indian Ocean cyclone season was the costliest and the most active season ever recorded since reliable records began in 1967. Additionally, it is also the deadliest cyclone season recorded in the South-West Indian Ocean, surpassing the 1891–92 season in which the 1892 Mauritius cyclone devastated the island of Mauritius. The season was an event of the annual cycle of tropical cyclone and subtropical cyclone formation in the South-West Indian Ocean basin. It officially began on 15 November 2018, and ended on 30 April 2019, with the exception for Mauritius and the Seychelles, which it ended on 15 May 2019. These dates conventionally delimit the period of each year when most tropical and subtropical cyclones form in the basin, which is west of 90°E and south of the Equator. Tropical and subtropical cyclones in this basin are monitored by the Regional Specialised Meteorological Centre in Réunion.

Two tropical cyclones existed outside the conventional bounds of the season, with Moderate Tropical Storm 01 in September and the remnants of Tropical Cyclone Lorna in May. From all of these cyclones during the season, all but Haleh and Savannah produced impacts on land, with Idai causing at least 1,593 deaths and leaving at least 2,262 people missing, and causing US$3.3 billion in damages in Mozambique, Zimbabwe, Malawi, and Madagascar. The season set a new record of nine intense tropical cyclones, the largest number since the start of reliable satellite coverage in 1967, surpassing the 2006–07 season.



Seasonal summary

The first tropical cyclone was an unnamed moderate tropical storm that formed northeast of Madagascar on 13 September 2018, two months before the official start of the season. Two cyclones formed in the month of November, with Intense Tropical Cyclone Alcide forming on 5 November, and Severe Tropical Storm Bouchra entering the basin from the Australian region on 9 November. Two tropical cyclones formed in the month of December, Cilida and Kenanga. Intense Tropical Cyclone Kenanga crossed into the basin from the Australian region, retaining its name assigned by TCWC Jakarta. Two moderate tropical storms formed in January, Desmond and Eketsang. Five more intense tropical cyclones formed during February and March: Funani, Gelena, Haleh, Idai, and Joaninha. In addition, Savannah crossed into the basin from the Australian basin as an intense tropical cyclone in March. On 21 April 2019, final two storms of the season formed at the same time, Kenneth and Lorna.

Systems

Moderate Tropical Storm 01

On 11 September, a disturbance formed in the open waters of Indian Ocean. On the next day, the system intensified to a tropical depression formed to the southwest of Diego Garcia. The system tracked west-southwestward, organizing slowly over marginally warm waters of 26–27 degrees Celsius and moderate wind shear. On 16 September, the tropical depression began to quickly weaken after encountering unfavorable conditions. On the next day, both the MFR and the JTWC issued their final warnings, and the system was downgraded to an extratropical low. The remains of the system dissipated a few hours later north of Madagascar. In post-storm analysis, the system was upgraded into a moderate tropical storm, although it remained unnamed.

Intense Tropical Cyclone Alcide

On 6 November, a tropical depression formed well to the east-northeast of Madagascar. The system continued to track generally west-southwestward into more favorable conditions for the next few hours, before strengthening into a Moderate Tropical Storm and was named Alcide later that day. It was downgraded to a tropical cyclone 6 hours later, mostly due to cooler sea temperatures and generally less favorable conditions. Alcide continued to weaken as it began an anticyclonic loop east of the northern tip of Madagascar, falling to tropical storm status at 12:00 UTC on 9 November. The system rapidly deteriorated thereafter, falling to tropical depression status at 00:00 UTC on 11 November; Météo-France discontinued advisories at noon that day.
The system continued east as a remnant low until 13 November, when the remaining convection vanished due to wind shear.

Severe Tropical Storm Bouchra

A weak low-pressure system developed in the equatorial Indian Ocean in Météo-France's area of responsibility on November 1 and moved slowly eastwards over the following few days while showing little signs of intensification. Late on November 9, as the developing precursor depression to Very Severe Cyclonic Storm Gaja in the Bay of Bengal moved further away and the competing low-level airflow convergence associated with it diminished, which was earlier associated with the westerly wind burst on either side of Indian Ocean. the system's structure organised sufficiently to be classified as a tropical disturbance by Météo-France. Very shortly afterwards, the system crossed the 90th meridian east and entered the Australian region, where it was classified by TCWC Jakarta as a tropical depression on November 10 local time. Later the same day, the JTWC assessed the developing low as having attained tropical storm status on the Saffir–Simpson hurricane wind scale, and assigned the system the unofficial designation 04S. A few hours later, at 10:00 UTC, the system moved back westwards and returned to the South-West Indian Ocean basin, where it gained the name 'Bouchra' from Météo-France and underwent a twelve-hour phase of rapid intensification to severe tropical storm status.

Over the following days, Bouchra fought increasingly unfavorable atmospheric conditions, and underwent a gradual weakening trend. During this time, the cyclone proceeded to track in a slow cyclonic loop just to the west of the border of the Australian region in weak overall steering influences, and was often quasi-stationary. After meandering here for a number of days, the system re-entered the Australian region late on November 12. By this stage, the system had weakened significantly from its peak intensity, and was only at tropical depression strength. The period of residence in the Australian basin proved to be short-lived once again, however, with Météo-France indicating that Ex-Tropical Storm Bouchra had returned to the far eastern part of their area of responsibility early on November 13. In the early hours of November 14, the Australian Bureau of Meteorology noted that the system had crossed back into the Australian region basin. However, on November 17, Bouchra crossed back over into the South-West Indian Ocean basin, as the storm began taking a southwestward trajectory.

Intense Tropical Cyclone Kenanga

On December 14, a tropical low formed southwest of Sumatra in the Australian region basin.

It slowly strengthened and on the next day, the system was officially named Kenanga as it tracked roughly southwestward. Continuing on this course, Kenanga entered the South-West Indian basin on December 16. On the next day, the system quickly intensified into an intense tropical cyclone, and Kenanga maintained this intensity for another day.

On the morning of the next day, the system encountered high wind shear and started weakening, and Kenanga was downgraded to a Moderate Tropical Storm by the evening of that day. The system was finally downgraded to an extratropical low on December 19.

On the next day, Kenanga re-intensified into tropical depression status. On December 22, Kenanga lost its remaining convection and dissipated. The system did not affect any land areas, and caused no damage or fatalities.

Intense Tropical Cyclone Cilida

On December 16, Météo-France tracked a low-pressure which had a chance of possible tropical cyclone development. While tracking southwest, it then intensified to tropical storm status and then cyclone status. On December 23, it passed east of Mauritius, bringing beneficial rainfall and gusting winds that knocked down tree branches. It then turned southeast and weakened, later dissipating in the far southern reaches of the basin.

Moderate Tropical Storm Desmond

A tropical depression formed near the east coast of Mozambique on January 17. During the next couple of days, the storm made a counterclockwise loop towards the west, before turning northward. The system intensified into a moderate tropical storm on January 19 and was named Desmond. The system gradually intensified as it drifted northward. The storm reached peak intensity on January 20, as a moderate tropical storm with 10-minute sustained winds of  wind and a minimum central pressure of 995 mbar. On the next day, Desmond made landfall in Mozambique. Afterward, the storm rapidly weakened and was downgraded to a remnant low on January 22. Later that day, Desmond turned eastward back towards the coast, while continuing to weaken. A few hours later, Desmond lost all of its remaining convection and dissipated on January 22.

Moderate Tropical Storm Eketsang

A disturbance formed over Madagascar on January 21. On the next day, the storm emerged into the Mozambique Channel and organized into a tropical depression. On January 23, the system strengthened into a moderate tropical storm and was named Eketsang. On the same day, the storm turned to the southeast, back towards Madagascar. On January 24, the storm curved around the south coast of Madagascar and weakened into a subtropical depression. Afterward, the storm began accelerating southeastward, before dissipating on January 26. 27 deaths were reported from the storm, and 1 person went missing, mostly due to landslides.

Intense Tropical Cyclone Funani

On February 2, a disturbance formed in the open Indian Ocean. The system in countered favorable conditions and began to rapidly intensify, reaching moderate tropical storm status on February 3 and further intensified into an intense tropical cyclone the next day. The storm recurved east and degan to move southwestwards. The system accelerated as it moved into an area of low sea surface temperature on February 7. The next day, it was downgraded to moderate tropical storm two days later. The storm transitioned to an extratropical cyclone on February 10 before dissipating later that day.

Intense Tropical Cyclone Gelena

Gelena was the second storm to affect the island of Rodrigues in a week, following Intense Tropical Cyclone Funani. Gelena brought strong winds that destroyed 90% of the electric grid on the island. Overall damage on the island were about US$1 million.

Intense Tropical Cyclone Haleh

On February 28, Tropical Depression 10 formed in the south central Indian Ocean, south of the Maldives. On March 2, the system strengthened into Moderate Tropical Storm Haleh, before intensifying further into a severe tropical storm later that day. On March 3, Haleh intensified into a tropical cyclone. On March 5, Haleh meandered into hostile conditions with low sea surface ocean heat content and medium vertical wind shear, and the system weakened back to a Category 1 tropical cyclone. Haleh gradually weakened over the next couple of days, eventually degenerating into a post-tropical low late on March 7.

Intense Tropical Cyclone Idai

Tropical Depression 11 formed off the east coast of Mozambique on March 4. Afterward, the tropical depression drifted northeastward very slowly, making landfall on Mozambique later that day. On March 6, Tropical Depression 11 was given a yellow tropical cyclone development warning by the Joint Typhoon Warning Center (JTWC). On March 7, the storm turned west-southwestward, while continuing to retain its tropical identity overland. On March 8, Tropical Depression 11 weakened and turned back towards the east. Early on March 9, the tropical depression emerged into the Mozambique Channel and began to organize. On the same day, the JTWC stated that the system had a high probability for genesis into a tropical cyclone, and later on the same day, the system strengthened into a moderate tropical storm and received the name Idai. On March 10, Idai began to rapidly intensify, strengthening into a tropical cyclone near Madagascar, and the system made yet another turn westward, moving to the southwest. On the next day, the storm intensified into the seventh intense tropical cyclone of the season, and soon reached its peak intensity as a Category 4-equivalent tropical cyclone. On March 12, Idai began to weaken, as the system underwent an eyewall replacement cycle. On March 13, Idai began accelerating westward. Idai quickly weakened after landfall, degenerating into a tropical depression later that day. Afterward, Idai slowly moved inland while dumping large amounts of rain, resulting in flash flooding. Late on March 16, Idai degenerated into a remnant low, but the storm's remnant continued dumping rain across the region. On March 17, Idai's remnant turned eastward once again, eventually re-emerging into the Mozambique Channel a second time on March 19. On March 21, Idai's remnants dissipated.

As a tropical depression, Idai affected Malawi and Mozambique, during its first landfall. At least 56 people died, and 577 others were injured due to flooding in Malawi. About 83,000 people were displaced. The southern districts of Chikwawa and Nsanje became isolated by floodwaters. In Mozambique, 66 people were killed by the flooding, and affected 141,000 people. The Council of Ministers required 1.1 billion metical (US$17.6 million) to help those who were affected by the flooding. In total, Idai killed at least 1,297 people and left thousands more missing, becoming one of the deadliest tropical cyclones in the modern history of Africa and the Southern Hemisphere as a whole. With this death toll, Idai is the deadliest tropical cyclone recorded in the South-West Indian Ocean basin, and the second-deadliest tropical cyclone overall in the Southern Hemisphere, behind only Cyclone Flores in 1973. In addition, the total damages from the cyclone amounted to US$3.3 billion (2019 USD), which would make Idai the costliest cyclone on record in the basin.

Tropical Cyclone Savannah

On March 18, Severe Tropical Cyclone Savannah crossed over from the Australian region basin into the South-West Indian basin, shortly after reaching its peak intensity. Savannah was classified as a tropical cyclone on the South-West Indian Ocean scale after it entered the basin. Savannah weakened soon after reaching its peak intensity. On March 19, Savannah transitioned into a post-tropical cyclone, with the system continuing southwestward. On the next day, Savannah's remnant looped eastward, before turning westward on March 21. The system weakened afterward, with Savannah's remnant dissipating on March 23.

Intense Tropical Cyclone Joaninha

On March 18, Tropical Depression 13 formed to the east of Madagascar. After a few days of meandering to the west and then the southeast, the system intensified into Moderate Tropical Storm Joaninha on March 22, turning southward as it did so. On March 23, Joaninha strengthened into a severe tropical storm. Early on March 24, Joaninha strengthened further into a tropical cyclone on the MFR scale. On the next day, Joaninha intensified into an intense tropical cyclone. After moving over cooler waters, Joaninha slowly began to weaken, dropping to severe tropical storm intensity on the MFR scale on March 29. On March 30, Joaninha became post-tropical shortly after merging with an upper-level low.

Nearly  of rain fell across the island during the passage of the system.

Intense Tropical Cyclone Kenneth

On April 21, Météo-France (MFR) initiated advisories on Tropical Disturbance 14, which was situated to the northeast of Madagascar. The system drifted westward, organizing as it did so. Early on April 23, the system strengthened into a tropical depression. Later that day, at 12:00 UTC, the tropical depression strengthened into a moderate tropical storm as was named Kenneth, becoming the fourteenth tropical storm of the season. Early on April 24, Kenneth strengthened into a tropical cyclone. Kenneth rapidly organized while approaching Mozambique, reaching Category 3-equivalent tropical cyclone intensity within several hours. On the same day, Kenneth was projected to strike Mozambique within a day and bring more flooding and wind damage to the nation, about a month after Cyclone Idai had devastated the region, raising fears that the ongoing humanitarian crisis there could be worsened by the storm. On the next day, Kenneth reached its peak intensity, becoming a Category 4-equivalent intense tropical cyclone, as the storm began to near landfall in Mozambique. However, at about that time, Kenneth initiated an eyewall replacement cycle and gradually began to weaken, just prior to landfall. This made Kenneth the most intense landfalling storm in Mozambique's recorded history. Kenneth's landfall also marked the second time in Mozambique's recorded history in which two storms have made landfall during the same season at tropical cyclone intensity or higher.

Kenneth underwent extremely rapid weakening upon making landfall, despite the relatively favorable atmospheric environment and flat terrain of northern Mozambique. On April 26, Kenneth weakened to tropical depression intensity, while continuing its southward motion. On April 27, Kenneth began drifting northward, also developing some thunderstorms off the coast of Mozambique. Kenneth continued to weaken, dissipating by 12:00 UTC on April 29.

Kenneth killed at least 52 people; seven on the island of Comoros, and at least 45 people in Mozambique. In Mozambique, Kenneth caused widespread damage in the city of Pemba, including extensive power outages and numerous felled trees. Kenneth is estimated to have caused at least $345 million in damages.

Tropical Cyclone Lorna

On April 21, Tropical Depression 15 formed to the southeast of the Maldives. The system moved southeastward, before turning south-southeastward on April 22, while slowly strengthening. On the next day, the system intensified into Moderate Tropical Storm Lorna, making the 2018–19 season the most active cyclone season recorded in the South-West Indian Ocean in the satellite era, surpassing the previous record set by the 1993–94 season. Lorna resumed a southeasterly direction on April 24, while continuing to organise. On April 25, Lorna then intensified into a severe tropical storm. On the same day, Lorna began to interact with a smaller tropical low to the east, in the Australian region basin, before absorbing the weaker system early on the next day. On April 26, the JTWC upgraded Lorna to Category 1 status, while Lorna began turning towards the south. Soon afterward, Lorna encountered relatively strong vertical wind shear and steadily decreasing sea temperatures as it continued to track southwards, causing its gradual intensification trend to halt, and the JTWC to downgrade the system to a high-end tropical storm.

On 28 April, somewhat unexpectedly, and contradicting forecasts by MFR and the JTWC, the system developed a clearly defined eye and underwent steady intensification. Consequently, MFR upgraded the system to a tropical cyclone, and the JTWC upgraded Lorna to Category 2 status on the Saffir–Simpson scale. Around this time, Lorna deviated from its predominantly southwards motion, and assumed a track to the south-southeast. Due to the system being located on the very eastern edge of the South-West Indian Ocean basin during the previous two days, this slight easterly motion caused the cyclone to become centred directly over the 90th meridian east—the boundary of the Australian Bureau of Meteorology's area of responsibility.

By 29 April, the structure of the cyclone had degraded significantly, primarily due to strong vertical wind shear and resulting dry air intrusion. As a result, the system was downgraded by the MFR to a severe tropical storm. Having lost tropical characteristics, the system was downgraded by the MFR at 12:00 UTC to a powerful storm-force post-tropical depression. Gale-force winds ceased by 12:00 UTC on April 30, and Ex-Tropical Cyclone Lorna exited the basin into the Australian region by 06:00 UTC on May 1. Soon afterward, Lorna became an extratropical low, before merging with another low-pressure system in the central southern Indian Ocean later that day.

Storm names
However, it is the Sub-Regional Tropical Cyclone Advisory Centers in Mauritius and Madagascar who name the systems. The Sub-Regional Tropical Cyclone Advisory Center in Mauritius names a storm should it intensify into a moderate tropical storm between 55°E and 90°E. If instead a cyclone intensifies into a moderate tropical storm between 30°E and 55°E then the Sub-Regional Tropical Cyclone Advisory Center in Madagascar assigns the appropriate name to the storm. Storm names are taken from three pre-determined lists of names, which rotate on a triennial basis, with any names that have been used automatically removed. Therefore, all storm names used this year were later removed from the rotation and replaced with a new name for the 2021–22 season, while the unused names remained on the list.

Kenanga entered this basin as a moderate tropical storm from the Australian region on December 16, retaining its name assigned by TCWC Jakarta. Similarly, Savannah entered this basin as an intense tropical cyclone from the Australian region on March 17, retaining its name assigned by TCWC Perth. Furthermore, Moderate Tropical Storm 01 which formed in September was not assigned a name because it was not classified as a moderate tropical storm until the post-analysis was completed.

After the season, the twelve names used were automatically retired and were replaced with Ana, Batsirai, Cliff, Dumako, Emnati, Fezile, Gombe, Halima, Issa, Jasmine, Karim and Letlama, respectively for the 2021–22 season.

Seasonal effects
This table lists all of the tropical cyclones and subtropical cyclones that were monitored during the 2018–2019 South-West Indian Ocean cyclone season. Information on their intensity, duration, name, areas affected, primarily comes from RSMC La Réunion. Death and damage reports come from either press reports or the relevant national disaster management agency while the damage totals are given in 2018 or 2019 USD.

|-
| One ||  || bgcolor=#| || bgcolor=#| || bgcolor=#| || None ||  ||  ||
|-
| Alcide ||  || bgcolor=#| || bgcolor=#| || bgcolor=#| || Agaléga, Madagascar, Tanzania ||  None ||  None ||
|-
|  ||  || bgcolor=#| || bgcolor=#| || bgcolor=#| || None ||  None ||  None ||
|-
|  ||  || bgcolor=#| || bgcolor=#| || bgcolor=#| || None ||  None ||  None ||
|-
|  ||  || bgcolor=#| || bgcolor=#| || bgcolor=#| || Mauritius ||  Minimal ||  None ||
|-
| Desmond ||  || bgcolor=#| || bgcolor=#| || bgcolor=#| || Mozambique, Madagascar ||  ||  ||
|-
| Eketsang ||  || bgcolor=#| || bgcolor=#| || bgcolor=#| || Madagascar ||  ||  ||
|-
|  ||  || bgcolor=#| || bgcolor=#| || bgcolor=#| || Rodrigues ||  Minimal ||  None ||
|-
|  ||  || bgcolor=#| || bgcolor=#| || bgcolor=#| || Madagascar, Mauritius, Rodrigues ||  ||  None ||
|-
|  ||  || bgcolor=#| || bgcolor=#| || bgcolor=#| || None ||  None ||  None ||
|-
|  ||  || bgcolor=#| || bgcolor=#| || bgcolor=#| || Mozambique, Malawi, Madagascar, Zimbabwe ||  ||  || 
|-
|  ||  || bgcolor=#| || bgcolor=#| || bgcolor=#| || None ||  None ||  None ||
|-
|  ||  || bgcolor=#| || bgcolor=#| || bgcolor=#| || Rodrigues ||  None ||  None || 
|-
|  ||  || bgcolor=#| || bgcolor=#| || bgcolor=#| || Seychelles, Madagascar, Comoros, Mozambique, Tanzania, Malawi ||  || || 
|-
|  ||  || bgcolor=#| || bgcolor=#| || bgcolor=#| || None ||  None ||  None || 
|-

See also

Weather of 2018 and 2019
Tropical cyclones in 2018 and 2019
List of Southern Hemisphere cyclone seasons
Atlantic hurricane seasons: 2018, 2019
Pacific hurricane seasons: 2018, 2019
Pacific typhoon seasons: 2018, 2019
North Indian Ocean cyclone seasons: 2018, 2019
2018–19 Australian region cyclone season
2018–19 South Pacific cyclone season
1999–2000 South-West Indian Ocean cyclone season – The third-deadliest South-West Indian Ocean cyclone season

Footnotes

References

External links

 Météo-France La Réunion 
 Direction Générale de la Météorologie de Madagascar 
 Mauritius Meteorological Services
 Joint Typhoon Warning Center (JTWC)

 
South-West Indian Ocean cyclone seasons
2018 SWIO
2019 SWIO